Cherry Ngan is a Hong Kong singer, actress and model. She is best known for her role in the 2013 Chinese film The Way We Dance for which she nominated as best actress at both the Hong Kong Film Award and the Golden Horse Awards. As well as acting Ngan has appeared in a number of advertising campaigns including those for McDonald's, Olympus and K-Swiss. In 2017 she released her debut single Flash (閃光).

Biography
Ngan grew up in Hong Kong and attended Sha Tin Government Secondary School where she appeared in a number of school plays and took part in after school theater groups studying acting and different styles of dance. At the age of 15, while still in school she discovered a casting call via Facebook for The Way We Dance and subsequently won the role of Fleur. In 2012 Ngan studied English Language and Literature at Hong Kong Baptist University working alongside her film career and attending award ceremonies. In 2017 Ngan announced she was dating film director Michael Ning.

Discography

Album
 Primary (2018)
Track Listing:
1. Flash 
2. Baby Stop 
3. The Villainess Debunks
4. No Man Is An Island 
5. Reverse Growth 
6. Flash (Remix)

Filmography

Music Video

References

External links 
 

1993 births
Living people
21st-century Hong Kong actresses
21st-century Hong Kong women singers
Hong Kong female models
Alumni of Hong Kong Baptist University